Nour Eddine Tilsaghani (born 1972 in Marrakech), he is a director and photographer, and has several exhibitions in Morocco and abroad.

Biography 
Nour Eddine Tilsaghani was born in Marrakech in 1972. He is a film director and photographer. His initial pictures were shown at The First Photography Spring in 1993 at the French Institute in Marrakech.

Career 
Tilsaghani Nour Eddine started his exhibition entitled "Protected passage" in Marrakesh. He exhibited at the Arab World Institute as part of the exhibition "Le Maroc contemporain", ⁣ at (la mairie de Tour), as part of a cultural exchange between the Dar Bellarj Foundation and (la mairie de Tour). He has also made individual photographic exhibitions, ⁣ the most recent exhibition in Big Apple, notebooks of a trip to New York City" and "Wink "Clin d'oeil. 

He directed a documentary film called (Religion as an aesthetic theme) for the media company Al Jazeera, ⁣ and also work in documentary with UNESCO in 2007 in project called (The slave trade in the Arab-Muslim world).

Awards 
Tilsaghani Nour Eddine in 2014, he was awarded the Sony France prize of the Contest Photo Magazine.He was the winner of the Grand Prix of COP 22 photo contest.

References

External links 

 Mutualart

Moroccan contemporary artists
Living people
1972 births
20th-century Moroccan artists
20th-century male artists
Moroccan photographers
21st-century male artists